The Neftyanik Baku 1966 season was Neftyanik Baku's 10th  Soviet Top League season.

Competitions

Soviet Top League

Results

Table

Goal scorers
14 goals
 Kazbek Tuaev
12 goals
 Anatoliy Banishevskiy
 Eduard Markarov

References

External links 
 Neftchi Baku at Soccerway.com
 USSR, 1966. First group A Results at wildstat.com

Neftçi PFK seasons
Association football clubs 1966 season
1966 in Azerbaijan